PX4 autopilot is an open-source autopilot system oriented toward inexpensive autonomous aircraft.

Low cost and availability enable hobbyist use in small remotely piloted aircraft. The project started in 2009 and is being further developed and used at Computer Vision and Geometry Lab of ETH Zurich (Swiss Federal Institute of Technology) and supported by the Autonomous Systems Lab and the Automatic Control Laboratory. Several vendors are currently producing PX4 autopilots and accessories.

Overview
PX4 supports the following features:

Support for multiple vehicle types, including fixed-wing aircraft, multicopters, helicopters, rovers, boats, and underwater vehicles
Fully manual, partially assisted, and fully autonomous flight modes
Vehicle stabilization
Waypoint navigation
Integration with position, speed, altitude, and rotation sensors
Automatic triggering of cameras or external actuators
PX4 is capable of integrating with other autopilot software, such as the QGroundControl ground control station software, via the MAVLink (Micro Air Vehicle Communication) protocol.

PX4 is open-source and available under a BSD-3-Clause license.

Supported hardware

For an up-to-date and complete list of the hardware supported by the PX4 Autopilot, visit their "Compatible Hardware" website.

See also
 Paparazzi Project
 ArduPilot
 Slugs
 OpenPilot
 Crowdsourcing
 Micro air vehicle

References

External links
 PX4 Homepage
 Dronecode Homepage

Avionics
Aircraft instruments
Unmanned aerial vehicles
Free software
Open-source hardware
Software using the BSD license